Robin Hood Engineering Ltd was a British kit car manufacturer based in Mansfield Woodhouse, Nottinghamshire. The factory covered  and was on a one and a half acre site.

History 
The company was founded in 1980 in Sherwood, Nottinghamshire and started by making Ferrari Daytona replicas based on the Rover SD1 and the Super Seven after the production by Lotus ended.

In 1989, a Triumph TR7 based Robin Hood was introduced with the affordable price tag of £995 + VAT. Motoring enthusiasts showed their support and several kits were sold. Development of the new product was continual and feedback from customers showed that a range of engine sizes were needed, so that more people could afford to run such a vehicle. The Triumph Dolomite superseded the TR7 as donor vehicle, a popular choice with engines ranging from 1100 cc to 2000 cc.

High Court action from Caterham Cars almost stopped production, however legal advice gave a remedy to the problem. Robin Hood Engineering were careful not to deviate from the strict guidelines set down as a result of the action.

The Monocoque style chassis (a structure formed from sheet steel without tubes) was manufactured using the Triumph Dolomite, Ford Cortina and Ford Sierra as donor vehicle. Although the donor vehicles and basic designs may have altered throughout the years, the main policy to supply value for money kits remained. Whilst other manufacturers had customers trawling scrap yards for an assortment of components to build cars, the Robin Hood policy of "One kit + one donor vehicle = car on the road" was a valuable selling point.

During 1996 and 1997 sales of Robin Hoods peaked at over 500 kits per year, and larger premises and new machinery were purchased to maintain production. In 1998, with the introduction of the Single Vehicle Approval test, the public were not so keen to embark on a build, preferring to wait and see what was going to happen. Implementation dates were put off several times by the Government and the whole of the kit car industry suffered.

This slack period enabled the owner to look carefully at Robin Hood Engineering's operations, and now in his fifties, ideally would have liked to have sold the business to allow him to concentrate on other interests. But with no offers forthcoming, the licence to manufacture Monocoque chassis about to expire and the recent heavy investment in new CNC machinery, the only option was to carry on with a brand new model.

With the assistance of a team of expert chassis designers, a revolutionary new chassis was conceived. The new style chassis was affectionately called the 'tubey' by staff and the 'Project 2B' (a reference to the affectionate nickname) was adopted as the kit name. Between the bulk collection dates of 21 August and 11 December 1999, exactly 205 kits were collected. Bulk collections have always been successful at Robin Hood Engineering, the record being one collection day in 1997 totalling 125 comprehensive kits.

On 25 September 2006 the assets of Robin Hood Engineering were bought by Great British Sports Cars Ltd.

The Zero 

The most recent model by Great British Sports Cars is called 'The Zero' The Zero was designed to be small, lightweight, and purposeful car, suited to road and track use. It is available in 9 colours, and compatible with a range of engines. It is available as a kit, partially assembled, or fully built.

References

External links 

 http://www.7-dna.com/ Forum for all 7 type vehicles that have some aspect of Lotus 7 DNA running through them, with only 1 member which is Steve Shaw.  
 https://web.archive.org/web/20060823134842/http://www.robinhoodsportscars.co.uk/
 http://www.greatbritishsportscars.co.uk/Contact/
 http://www.rhocar.org/  Robin Hood Owners Club and Register
 http://nw.rhocar.org/  North West Area Website
 Great British Sports Cars Ltd.
 Gallery.
 Make your own ZERO

Defunct motor vehicle manufacturers of England
Kit car manufacturers
Lotus Seven replicas
Companies based in Nottinghamshire
British companies established in 1980
1980 establishments in England